Kalindi Alves de Souza (29 August 1993 – 10 April 2022), known as Kalindi, was a Brazilian professional footballer who played as a right-back.

Club career
Kalindi made his professional debut in the Segunda Liga for Penafiel on 2 December 2015 in a game against Mafra.

On 10 April 2022, he died in Brazil due to a cardiac arrest, after a battle with an autoimmune disease.

References

External links
 

1993 births
2022 deaths
Sportspeople from Pará
Brazilian footballers
Association football defenders
Primeira Liga players
Liga Portugal 2 players
Tuna Luso Brasileira players
F.C. Penafiel players
C.D. Nacional players
Brazilian expatriate footballers
Brazilian expatriate sportspeople in Portugal
Expatriate footballers in Portugal